Máirtín Mór Ó Máille, was an Irish smuggler and duelist who died circa 1800.

In 1794 Mansergh St. George claimed that Richard "Humanity Dick" Martin of Connemara allowed a man called "O'Malley or O'Mealey ... to live in a state of permanent defence of part of the Martin estate, a tiny peninsula located between Greatman's Bay and Costello Bay. ... [he] was the acknowledged head of the Connemara smugglers ... an associate and creditor of Humanity Dick and a popular figure with the inhabitants of Carraroe because of his lavish hospitality and ingratiating ways."

Ó Máille was a legendary figure even in his own lifetime, entertaining all guests with several barrels of wine. He conspired with Martin to keep the strict letter of the law out of Connemara, so long as it suited themselves. As Martin was in a regular state of financial embarrassment, he found Ó Máille's credit useful. 

Máirtín Mór Ó Máille became involved in a trivial argument, which led to a duel in which he was fatally wounded. Martin, who had not been in Connemara at the time, was shocked and angry to hear of his death, saying:

Ó Máille preferred a hole in his guts to one in his honor, but there wouldn't have been a hole in either if I'd been told of it!

See also

 Grace O'Malley
 George Ó Máille

References

 Appendices by James Hardiman (1846) to West or Iar-Connacht by Ruaidhrí Ó Flaithbheartaigh
 Humanity Dick Martin: King of Connemara, 1754-1834, Shevawn Lynam, ; Lilliput Press, May 1989.
 Stones of Aran: Pilgrimage, Tim Robinson (cartographer), Lilliput Press, 1986
 The History of Galway, Sean Spellissy, 1999. 

People from County Galway
Irish duellists
Duelling fatalities
Smugglers